Marrakesh or Marrakech is a city in Morocco, North-Western Africa.

Marrakesh or Marrakech may also refer to:

Agreements 
 Marrakech Accords
 Marrakech  Agreement

Media and entertainment

Music

Artists and labels 
 Marrakesh Records, a UK indie label
 Marakesh (band), a Ukrainian alternative rock band
 Marracash, an Italian rapper
 Nass Marrakech, a Gnawa music group

Songs 
 Marrakesh Express, a 1969 song by Crosby, Stills & Nash
 "Marrakech" (song), a 2004 song by ATB
 "Marrakech", by BWO from Halcyon Days
 "Marrakesh", by Giorgio Moroder from Giorgio's Music
 "Marrakech", by Hybrid from Morning Sci-Fi
 "Marrakesh", by Mina from Italiana
 "Marrakesh", by New Model Army from Impurity
 "Marakesh", by Tangerine Dream from Optical Race
 "Marrakech", by ZHU from Stardustexhalemarrakechdreams EP

Film and television 
 Marrakech (film), a 1996 Dutch television film

Other uses 
 Marrakech (game), a board game
 Battle of Marrakech
 Abdelwahid al-Marrakushi
 "Marrakesh Express", a song by Crosby, Stills & Nash

See also